Newton Cable was a small cable provider in Toronto, Ontario, Canada. It served neighbourhoods in northern Toronto from its offices in North York.

Newton Cable, or Newton Cable Communications Ltd, was founded in the late 1960s and originally known as Willowdowns Cable. The Newton family got a grant of a cable television (CATV) licence by the Department of Communications (DOC) for parts of Downsview and Willowdale neighbourhoods.

The cable system covered a geographic area with Sheppard Avenue as its southern border, Steeles Avenue its northern border, Bathurst Street its eastern border, and Dufferin Street its western border. The main offices, production studio, and its head end was originally located at 979 Alness Street and later located at 78 Martin Ross Avenue.

By the early 1990s, cable television operators gradually came under increased pressure from satellite operators and local telephone companies, which sought to compete in the delivery of video and other data services. Cable TV operators, having a strategic advantage in network architecture, responded by beginning to invest heavily to make their systems two-way capable, in part through the use of fibre optic cables and optical transmission systems to allow the delivery of services such as video-on-demand, internet, and more.

But these significant changes away from traditional CATV services, and the requirement of heavy new investment, prompted the owners to sell Newton to one of the multiple system operators (MSOs) in Canada. After much speculation, the business was sold in 1992 to Rogers Cable.

Cable 10
Newton, like most local cable TV providers, encouraged the community in which they were based in to join in. Community members could suggest new show ideas or get involved in shows currently on the air. Newton also offered free technical courses to all members of the community, allowing everyone from students to business executives a chance to learn how to operate television production equipment. After many hours of hands on training, these people were able to operate camera, audio and editing equipment, as well as being able to set up lighting for sets. This was a great opportunity for people to learn these skills, but many volunteers also went on to work in the film and television industry both behind the scenes and in front of the camera.

Newton also had close relationships with high schools located in the North York area. Schools such as Newtonbrook Secondary School would put together shows to be aired.

Cable 10 programming

Cable 10 aired programming Monday-Friday, 4pm-11pm. Newton Cable was a member of the Metro Cable Association and aired programming from Rogers and Maclean-Hunter, nightly. Some of the programs produced by Newton were on for many years and the hosts were well known in the community.

A slice of 1980s cable 10 programming
Health Here and Now, City By Night, Sports Den, Jock Talk, Teen Talk, Traffic Tips & Traumas, Fitness Facts and Fiction, The Movie Show, SJK, Cooking with Steve Jacobs, Singles Scene, Kaleideoscope, Let's Talk, Ask Dr. Jenchin, Doo Doo-The Clown, Zip and Zap, Streetbeat, Arena, Limelight, Splash Page, Jewish Journal, Your Money, OVERTIME Sports Talk, Backstage Pass, On The Ropes, Triva Challenge, Sonnee's Seniors, Chalk Talk (The Whine Line), and the Post 4:30 Blues Show.

Alumni

The most famous alumni to pass through the halls of Newton Cable was Ed the Sock a.k.a. Steven Joel Kerzner, who first dipped his covered toe on the airwaves at Newton Cable.

Steve Jacobs (Program Director) went on to be a weatherman at the Weather Network, CFTO-CTV and Chief Meteorologist at KIII TV (ABC) in Texas. He is currently the Chair of CMOS -Canadian Meteorological and Oceanographic Society - Southern Ontario Chapter. He appears on  TV Shopping Channels worldwide representing Medical, Health and Wellness products.

See also
 Rogers Television
 Shaw Communications
 Maclean-Hunter

Defunct cable and DBS companies of Canada